America's Answer is a 1918 American documentary and war silent film directed by Edwin F. Glenn. It chronicles the arrival of the first half-million American troops in France during World War I.

References

External links

 

1918 films
1918 documentary films
Films shot in France
American black-and-white films
American silent feature films
American documentary films
1910s English-language films
1910s American films